Ochyrotica misoolica is a moth of the family Pterophoridae. It is known from New Guinea and the Moluccas.

The wingspan is 14–16 mm. Adults have been recorded from June to July and from September to October on the Moluccas.

References

External links
Papua Insects

Ochyroticinae